Convento dell'Incontro is a Franciscan monastery that sits on the highest hill top south west of Florence in Bagno a Ripoli. It was the site of the Battle of Incontro on 8 August 1944 when the 2nd Battalion Duke of Cornwall's Light Infantry plus attachments took the position against fierce opposition from a German Panzergrenadier Regiment.

The bell tower described in the battle is now demolished. See also Northern Irish Horse articles (they provided support in their Churchill tanks).

The Duke of Cornwall's Light Infantry were awarded a Battle Honour, probably the only occasion this has been awarded to a single battalion. It was also describe as "a textbook example of a battalion attack". Ref: Obituary of commanding officer.

After the battle the Germans retreated north of the River Arno.

Monasteries in Tuscany